AVM is a consumer electronics company founded in 1986 in Berlin, Germany. The company produces communications, networking devices such as DSL, ISDN, Wireless and VoIP products. It had sales of €580 million in 2020 with 840 employees.  It is well known for its popular FRITZ!Box series.

Products

AVM is the most popular producer for consumer and home networking products in Germany. The company has a share of around 50 percent of the German market for routers for private users. It sells DSL and Cable routers, WLAN and other networking products:
 FRITZ!Box – Home networking for DSL, cable, FTTH and LTE.
 FRITZ!Fon – HD telephony, Internet services and music for the FRITZ!Box.
 FRITZ!WLAN – Range extender and USB WLAN sticks.
FRITZ!DECT – Smart home appliances
 FRITZ!Powerline – FRITZ!Powerline expands home networking via the existing power supply.
 FRITZ!Apps – Applications for smartphones for the FRITZ! range of products.
 FRITZ!Card – Internal ISDN card for the PCI slot.

History
The company was founded in 1986 by four students: Johannes Nill, Peter Faxel, Ulrich Müller-Albring and Jörg-Detlef Gebert.
AVM sold its first ISDN card in 1989 for 4.300 D-Mark (2.150 Euro) to larger businesses. The company's breakthrough came in 1995 with the introduction of the FRITZ!-brand and the FRITZ!Card, an ISDN card for PCs. The name Fritz was chosen "because a non-technical name has been sought which should indicate winking German workmanship abroad." AVM's market share for ISDN cards grew continuously to a peak of over 80 percent in 2004.

At CeBIT 2004 AVM introduced the first FRITZ!Box, a combination of DSL modem and router, later with Wi-Fi and integrated PBX. Published in 2007, the FRITZ!Box Fon WLAN 7270 was seen as innovative by supporting WLAN Draft-N (IEEE 802.11n) and containing a DECT base station and a media server.

According to market research firm IDC (2007), AVM had a market share in CPE-Equipment of 60 percent in Germany and 18 percent in Europe.

In recent years, AVM is also engaging in the field of home automation and smart home.
The "AVM" in the company name is the acronym for "Audio Visual marketing" and refers to the company's beginnings as BTX service.

See also 

 List of VOIP companies

References

External links

 

Electronics companies of Germany
Manufacturing companies based in Berlin
Networking hardware companies
German companies established in 1986
VoIP companies of Germany
Wireless networking hardware
1986 establishments in West Germany
German brands